Zoom Technologies may refer to:

 Zoom Video Communications Inc., an American software company which developed the Video conferencing software Zoom
 ZoomInfo Technologies Inc., a Vancouver based Software as Service company
 Zoom Corporation, a Japanese audio company
 Zoom Telephonics, a Boston-based manufacturer of networking equipment